This is the character list of 2020 Ultra Series Ultraman Z, as well as its related spin-offs; Ultra Galaxy Fight: The Absolute Cospiracy and Sevenger Fight.

STORAGE
 is an attack team established to fight monsters and the disasters they create using special anti-monster combat robots. Their preference in robots is due to Japan's popular culture with it. The team itself is separated into two divisions: the Special Airborne Armor that actively combat monsters and the mechanic team that repairs SAA machines. Nonetheless, both factions are easily cooperative with each other. After the destruction of Kelbim through a test run with D4 Ray, STORAGE was disbanded when the majority of its members protested Kuriyama and the upper command of GAFJ for their unethical use of D4. Whereas a portion of them were relegated to different jobs in separate departments, Yoko and a handful of former members were given positions in its succeeding group, SAAG. At the time of Celebro's reign of terror towards the entire globe as Destrudos, Hebikura/Juggler amasses the former STORAGE members and mutinied against the SAAG to take down the alien parasite in a final fight that determines the fate of the Planet Earth. At the end of the battle, STORAGE was reinstated into GAFJ with Celebro under captivity, while Hebikura/Juggler and Haruki had since left the team for outer space.

When a STORAGE member piloted a SAA unit, remaining operatives in the field would usually drive into the scene with a Toyota LQ-based  patrol car and armed with a beam rifle.

Haruki Natsukawa
 is the 23-year-old protagonist of the series, a rookie pilot of STORAGE and a Karate master with a huge sense of justice. He bonded with Z after a near-death experience and ever since then transforms into the giant to combat daily monster attacks. At some point in the fight against the Red Kings, Haruki begins to doubt the ideas of "lives to be protected" and "beings to be killed" after realizing that some of the monsters he fought were not inherently malicious, until the visit to his father in his past puts his doubts to rest. During the disbandment of STORAGE, Haruki was relegated to SAAG's guarding officer before Juggler reformed their old team to rescue Yoko and defeating Destrudos. At the end of the final episode, Haruki decided to depart for outer space in order to help those in need, forcing him to part ways with STORAGE members but swears to return for Bon Festival and New Years Day celebration.

By scanning three different  stored in his , Haruki can grant Z access to different forms based on past Ultra Warriors and perform the Ultra's finishing moves. The Z Riser was developed by Ultraman Hikari and received its name when Ultraman Z volunteered to be a tester under Zero's suggestion.

Shota Hebikura/Jugglus Juggler

 is STORAGE's 34-year-old captain who acts as an older brother-like figure to the rest of his young teammates. Like Haruki, Hebikura is also athletic and usually puts the rookie through intensive drills in the training room. Despite bidding his time in STORAGE to steal one of their SAA Units, Juggler went into developing a genuine bond with the team members and would resort to use whatever necessary methods to keep them safe.

As revealed in Life's Decision Height: The Story of STORAGE's Foundation, Juggler arrived on Earth in year 2010 after chasing Grigio Raiden. He slipped into the ranks of GAFJ by replacing the recently deceased member Shota Hebikura and passing off his different appearance as a case of reconstructive surgery from the accident. Fast forward to the present day in Ultraman Z, he crafted his own  from Haruki/Z's Z Riser during Peguila's incident, allowing him to become Zeppandon or any of the fusion monsters. Although mostly on-duty as Hebikura, Juggler would resort to his Demon form during undercover missions and spying on Celebro's schemes. After STORAGE's disbandment, Juggler quit the GAFJ as a whole and exposed his identity to Haruki/Z after rescuing Yoko from Ultroid Zero, but chooses to save his former co-worker over stealing the Ultroid Zero to himself. With Destrudos running rampant across the world, Juggler reform STORAGE to reclaim their facility and incapacitated the SAAG members before they commenced their attack. After Celebro's capture by Yuka, Juggler decided to leave the team and embark for outer space, finally returning to his old tuxedo.

: A fusion of Zetton, Pandon and Maga-Orochi's tail that debuted in episode 16 of Ultraman Orb. After creating his copy of Z Riser, the Monster Medals of their components also allow him to reform said monster for combat purposes, first used to test Z's Z Lance Arrow. In addition to the Tri/Five King, Zeppandon and the Dark Z Riser was Juggler's sole means of fighting giant opponents after losing his ability to become giant prior to the series. Juggler reused Zeppandon for the second and final time in order to fight Five King/Celebro over the possession of Ultroid Zero. The resulting fight ended with a stalemate when Juggler was forced to abandon Ultroid for Haruki's life, effectively destroying his Dark Z Riser.
Tri-King and Five King: See below

 reprises his role as Jugglus Juggler. Eager to return to the Ultra Series, Takaya immediately accepted the role after being offered in summer 2019.

Yoko Nakashima
 is a 24-year-old female member and ace pilot of STORAGE. She has admiration for older men and Ultraman Z, often referring to him as "Lord Z". Because of her higher score in test piloting, Yoko is usually assigned to pilot the King Joe STORAGE Custom, as she is capable of handling the robot's complex systems.

Yoko's father was a GAFJ officer who taught her in self-defense skills and shaped her mentality into dating stronger men. This resulted in her frequently challenging her admirers to arm-wrestling matches which she has never once lost. After STORAGE's disbandment, Yoko was conscripted into SAAG to pilot the Ultroid Zero. In the penultimate episode, Celebro possessed Yoko as its final host and prepares to exterminate mankind by piloting Ultroid Zero, later Destrudos. Yoko was rescued by Haruki through King Joe STORAGE Custom, where she exorcised Celebro on her own and reclaim the Belial Medal for Z to reform Delta Rise Claw.

Kojiro Inaba
 is the 59-year-old leader of STORAGE's mechanics division in maintaining their Special Aircraft robots and is deeply trusted by other co-workers. He is nicknamed  and gives off a Shōwa atmosphere.

As revealed in Life's Decision Height: The Story of STORAGE's Foundation novel, Inaba joined the Global Allied Forces in his late 20s. After several promotions, he was assigned to the Institute of Advanced Studies, participating in the development of weapons and serving as a test pilot. While secretly designing bipedal robots in his spare time, he was introduced to Kuriyama by then-GAFJ director Kimisaki, wherein both of them established the GAFJ robot development department in 2009. Although reluctant to use Grigio Raiden as a reference material, Kuriyama managed to persuade Inaba by taking full responsibility.

Following STORAGE's disbandment in the present day by Celebro-possessed Kuriyama, Inaba quit GAFJ and entrusting his former workers in SAAG to take care of the SAA Units. He eventually returned when Juggler decided to reform the team and piloted Sevenger during their operation to save Yoko.

Yuka Ohta
 is the 22-year-old lead scientist with passion for monsters, hence her occupation in STORAGE allows her to observe them closely. Yuka develops the anti-monster combat robots and knowledgeable about biology and historic legends, which help with her analysis. When conducting experiments on monsters, Yuka brings their essence or specific body parts to STORAGE's headquarters for examination. She often makes and offers questionable juice mix with mysterious ingredients to others.

Yuka's fondness in monsters started in her great-grandmother's hometown, 18 years prior to the series. During her stay at her great-grandmother's home, after hearing the legend of Horoboros from her great-grandmother, she encountered the very monsters when she was lost in its territory at night. After STORAGE's disbandment, Yuka was relegated into a researcher in Monster Research Center until Juggler saved her from the GAFJ forces and rejoined STORAGE to rescue Yoko from Destrudos. When the monster was destroyed, Yoko and Kaburagi managed to catch Celebro for dissection.

Yuka usually carries a personal tablet for communication and analysis purposes. It can also act as a control console by attaching it to a SAA Unit's cockpit. The only SAA she ever piloted was the King Joe STORAGE Custom, remote controlling the Leg Carrier to assist Yoko/Sevenger in finishing Barossa III.

Other members
: One of Yoko's admirers and loses in an arm-wrestling match in order to ask her out on a date. During STORAGE's disbandment and formation of SAAG, Satoshi choose to quit GAFJ out of protest against their upper management.
: A member of Satoshi's circle of friends. Alongside Hiroshi, he choose to join the succeeding group SAAG despite Satoshi's protest, as both men wanting to provide financial support for their family members.
: An unseen STORAGE member who is in charge of public relations, constantly publishing reports of STORAGE's exploits after their fight. He was a former schoolmate of Haruki during their days in defense force academy.

SC
The mechas were developed by lead scientist Yuka and maintained by Inaba's team of mechanics after each sortie. Due to limited budget, only two units (Sevenger and Windom) were initially manufactured, although additional models are considered for development. As revealed by the director, the SC units were made based on GAFJ's decade-long attempt in studying and reverse-engineer of Grigio Raiden's mechanical physiology on Yamanashi Prefecture. With the sole exception of Sevenger, who had been sent to a museum operated by GAFJ to promote the other machines, the SC Units were assigned to SAAG during STORAGE's temporary disbandment.

: The first of STORAGE's mecha to be created and the first human-built robot mecha, piloted Haruki and/or Yoko. Within each missions, Sevenger can only operate for 3 minutes, based on its three battery packs. In terms of long-distance transportation from STORAGE's base, it has a jetpack with separate fuel. Inaba would modify Sevenger to include  punch attack. At some point after Grigio Raiden's death, Sevenger was decommissioned to be put in a museum for display as King Joe took over its role as STORAGE's major SC unit. During STORAGE's disbandment and Alien Barossa III's attack, Yoko choose to pilot Sevenger in against the alien and finish it with Beliarok's help. First appeared in episode 34 of Ultraman Leo, Sevenger's introduction to the series was suggested by director Taguchi for a cuter character and to prevent Ultraman Z from being overshadowed by stronger robots at the series' premier. In Sevenger Fight, Sevenger was given a faulty rifle named  and  dagger.
: An underwater-oriented armament for Sevenger, which includes the  harpoon cannon. Prior to Ultraman Z's arrival in Fight! Sevenger, STORAGE were ordered to take care of Deeplus' attack in Suruga Bay. Bako and his team of mechanics modified Sevenger into an underwater combat robot, which Haruki piloted and fired the harpoon onto the monster. When Deeplus damaged Sevenger's jetpack, Haruki made use of the incident by dragging the monster to the surface.
: A modified variant of Sevenger which Yuka constructed for space exploration, appeared exclusively in episodes 6 and 7 of Sevenger Fight. At some point after Haruki and Z's departure to outer space, Yoko and Yuka boarded Sevenger in a test drive to Mars, but its warp drive broke mid-journey, forcing the robot to crash landed in a planet where monsters were running wild. It received assistance from both Juggler and Ultraman Z Beta Smash.
 : A water dispensing equipment that Sevenger armed with in order to counter Vortex Fire's attack, only for said equipment to be destroyed. Appeared exclusively in chapter 7 of Fight! Sevenger.
 : A set of armor that covers Sevenger on every parts of the body, save for the head and arm joints. Created from the analysis of Vortex Fire's attacks, it is capable of resisting against opponents with flame attacks and has a built-in cooling system. The armor was used in chapters 10 and 11 of Fight! Sevenger and is later purged from the titular robot by Yoko in order to continue the fight with Ashuran.
 XSAA-8 : The machine which serves as a prototype to Windom that appeared in Fight! Sevenger chapter 8, which Yoko piloted to assist Haruki/Sevenger in carrying Red Smogy towards Vortex Fire.
: The second of STORAGE's mecha, presented as speedy and versatile. Due to its lighter built, the robot is capable of operating for a longer period than Sevenger. Unfortunately, Yuka discovered too late that its internal workings are different from her original plan, thus the charging period took longer than the intended process. Using a piece of Neronga's horn, she was able to speed up the process, allowing Windom to assist Z in against Telesdon/Erimaki Telesdon. After that, a new battery was made based on Neronga's horn. Although Windom went on to be piloted by Haruki once Yoko get to board King Joe SC, Juggler piloted it in the final battle against Destrudos in their operation to save Yoko. First appeared in episode 1 of Ultraseven.
: STORAGE's own attempt at reverse-engineering Alien Barossa's King Joe robot after they salvaged its remains, designating the unit as a firepower type. Through analysis on the Pedan technology, STORAGE was able to construct an engine with 5 times of Windom's original output.
In against a group of Kelbim, King Joe SC was fitted with the D4 Ray under Kuriyama (Celebro)'s order as a test run, effectively causing an entire city block to be devoured by a dimensional collapse until Z neutralizes it. It was finally piloted by Haruki in STORAGE's final stand against Destrudos, using King Joe SC's Pedanium Hammer to burst through the monster to rescue Yoko from Celebro's possession.
The Core Ship is the robot's main cockpit and through there, the other parts can also be controlled remotely.
: An alternate configuration of King Joe SC's parts into a form resembling a tank. In addition to retaining its armaments, King Joe SC can also use smoke grenades as a form of concealment.

GAFJ
 is the Japanese branch of the Global Allied Forces, an organization authorized to deal against monster attacks.

When STORAGE was reformed to reclaim their base, Juggler incapacitated every available SAAG officers after blocking their entrance.

Director Kuriyama
Despite his long, nagging lectures, he is actually a worrywart who is prone to stomach aches. He is often worrying of the collateral damages brought by the monster attacks and the cost for development budget.

As detailed in the Life's Decision Height: The Story of STORAGE's Foundation prequel novel, Kuriyama conceived the idea of fighting monsters with robots since his early days as a deputy director. After voicing his aforementioned idea to his colleagues, then-GAFJ director Kimisaki introduced Kuriyama to Inaba as the two became fast friends and established GAFJ's robot department. When their project hit a dead end, Kuriyama discovered the opportunity to analyze the recently crashed Grigio Raiden as the basis of SAA units, eventually leading to the foundation of STORAGE as well.

During GAFJ's experimentation on D4 Ray, Kuriyama was possessed by Celebro after a run-in with captain Asano, who proceed to use the director's position into authorizing the D4 Ray and the creation of Ultroid Zero. Celebro would left Kuriyama's body for Yoko once his plan nears completion to hijack the Ultroid Zero. He was hospitalized after the incident, but his injuries were scapegoated to STORAGE members per Celebro's plan.

Shinya Kaburagi
 is a 26-year-old researcher from GAFJ's 's biochemical research department, a group tasked with the cleanup and research of leftovers from the resulting fight between STORAGE and their monster opponents. While delivering a canister of Genegarg's remains, Celebro possessed him as a medium to operate on Earth. Due to Kaburagi's body sustaining heavy injuries after months of possession, Celebro left him for Asano while pinning all of his crimes to Kaburagi to retain his cover. After Destrudos' destruction, Kaburagi returned to work for MRC and assisted Yuka in catching Celebro when the alien parasite escaped its destruction to dissect its remains.

Minor GAFJ officers
: The captain of GAFJ's police division, who issued an arrest warrant to "Kaburagi" after his numerous atrocities in the monster attacks, unaware that the youth was possessed by Celebro the entire time. Although he managed to pin Kaburagi, Asano was disarmed by Juggler and forcefully possessed by Celebro as a cover before moving on to Kuriyama.
: GAFJ's chief of operations, she is the head of the development project for Ultroid Zero, as well as the captain of the newly formed SAAG following STORAGE's disbandment. An arrogant war hawk, she is prideful in the development of D4 and its use as a weapon, regardless of casualties involved. When Kuriyama (Celebro) framed the former STORAGE members as aliens in the height of Ultroid Zero's hijacking and global-scale terrorism, she tries to counter the reformed STORAGE's munity with the order shoot to kill, but was incapacitated by Juggler.
: The former GAFJ director who preceded Kuriyama prior to the series. In Life's Decision Height: The Story of STORAGE's Foundation, he introduced then-deputy director Kuriyama to Inaba after he voiced the opinion to use giant robots.
: An organization which Kuriyama and Inaba established in year 2010 for the development of SAA Units, appearing exclusively in Life's Decision Height: The Story of STORAGE's Foundation.
Shota Hebikura: The original Shota Hebikura, who participated in the test unit as their pilot. In August 2013, Hebikura was caught in an accident during the test piloting of a SAA unit that claimed his life. Jugglus Juggler, who had arrived on Earth since 2010, buried Hebikura's lifeless body elsewhere and taking the latter's place in the accident, while his different appearance was passed off as a case of reconstructive surgery in order to slip into the ranks of GAFJ, eventually promoted into STORAGE's captain during the premise of Ultraman Z.
: A test pilot from Osaka Prefecture who appeared exclusively in Life's Decision Height: The Story of STORAGE's Foundation. Alongside the original Hebikura, she became one of the many test pilots of the SAA prototype and was killed in a piloting accident.

Ultra Warriors

Ultraman Z
 is the titular hero of the series, an Inter Galactic Defense Force cadet whose age is 5,000 years old. Z speaks in an unusual dialect, but overall has a passionate sense of justice and seeks apprenticeship under his idol, Zero. His name was given to him by Ultraman Ace back in the Land of Light, intending the young warrior to fight to the very end of his life. As revealed in the Voice Drama series, Z volunteered himself to be a tester for Hikari's Z Riser under Zero's suggestion. He was accepted into the Inter-Galactic Defense Force after he passed his test in a sparring match against Zero.

During the events of Ultra Galaxy Fight: The Absolute Conspiracy, Z accompanied Mebius and Taiga in the fight against the Zetton Army. Although his inexperienced caused him to be outnumbered, Z was saved by the timely arrival of the Ultra League. After failing to save Yullian, Z decided to chase Genegarg for its theft of Ultra Medals. In the series proper, he was entrusted with the Z Riser and chased Genegarg to Earth, where he bonded with Haruki to revive the young pilot's life. In addition to reclaiming the stolen Ultra Medals, Z assisted STORAGE in fighting against monster attacks and Celebro's constant machinations on Earth. After Celebro defeated Z with Destrudos, the Ultra was forced to separate from his host since another transformation would injure their bodies, but Haruki bypassed this restriction in order to save a falling Yoko from Destrudos' clutch. After defeating Destrudos on Earth, Z decided to embark on his mission to outer space, bringing along Haruki and the revived Beliarok.

His Ultra Z Riser, the device which he gave to Haruki as means of transformation, can also double as a combat weapon. In his original form, Z can only sustain for 50 seconds on Earth and transforms only during emergency cases. In the final battle against Destrudos, Z was reduced to Original after Beliarok's destruction, but his strong bonds with Haruki compensated what he lacked for, managing to fire a Zestium Beam that surpassed Destrudos' D4 Ray and putting an end to Celebro's machinations on Earth.

To make up for his lack of additional strength, Z can access  forms when Haruki scans three different Ultra Medals of past Ultra Warriors using the Z Riser. These forms are capable of using a shared additional weapon named , an ancient artifact from Alaska that was initially utilized by an ancient Ultra to seal Peguila.

: A speed-based form obtained through Ultraseven, Leo and Zero's Ultra Medals.
: A strength-based form obtained through Ultraman, Ace and Taro's Ultra Medals. Z fights with a dignified style akin to a professional wrestler.
: A sorcery-based form obtained through Tiga, Dyna and Gaia's Ultra Medals. He is skilled in versatile beam attacks and tricky fighting styles. The Medals required to access this form were originally salvaged by Juggler before he returned it to the Ultra at the height of Five King's attack. By accessing , he can summon the Ultras that make up his form to simultaneously fire their beam attacks.
: A form that is exclusive to Ultraman Fusion Fight: Z Heat, accessed through the use of Zoffy, Tiga and Mebius' Ultra Medals. It allows Z to freely manipulate heat and is able to exert both brute strength and super speed.
: Z's strongest form, obtained from using Zero Beyond, Belial Atrocious and Geed's . This form allows Z to generate golden energy storms and is the only one capable of wielding the Beliarok.

In the English dub of Ultra Galaxy Fight: The Absolute Conspiracy, he is voiced by Peter von Gomm.

Beliarok
The  was originally a space needle required to defeat Greeza by sewing the anomaly itself. When Geed was briefly assimilated into the monster, part of his Belial DNA merged with the sword, giving it sentience and the abilities of Ultraman Belial. Despite being Z's personal weapon, his allegiance is fickle and is able to switch to other users so long that they satisfy his own interest. Although Juggler won the Beliarok fair and square, the weapon decided to stick to Haruki after having faith in the young boy's ability to satiate his interest. The Beliarok was initially killed in its attempt to block a D4 Ray beam from Destrudos, but revived itself and joined Z and Haruki's departure to space.

In addition to redirecting his opponent's attack, the Beliarok can execute three finishers by pressing the button behind his head. Should anyone try to wield Beliarok without his consent, he can deliver a small lightning bolt or increase its own density to prevent from being misused.

Ultraman Zero

Riku Asakura/Ultraman Geed

Due to the Devil Splinter being widespread across the universe, Riku participated in the duty to hunt and exterminate them. In , Riku lost his Geed Riser after being damaged from fighting Gillvalis, forcing Pega to deliver the Z Riser from Ultraman Hikari as a compensation. While chasing the rogue AI to Earth, Riku found himself allying with Z, STORAGE and Juggler before getting kidnapped into manufacturing Belial's Monster Medal. Despite wanting to assist Z in defending Earth, Haruki reassured his senior as he joined Pega in tracking the Devil Splinters in space. Riku returned at some point of time when Greeza rampaged on Earth. While assimilated into the void monster, Geed managed to briefly halt its actions while his Belial DNA created the Beliarok, which Z in the Delta Rise Claw managed to obtain in slaying Greeza. As Hikari had fixed the Geed Riser, Riku decided to give Haruki his own Ultra Medals and resume his original mission.

By inserting his own personalized Ultra Access Card and a trio of Ginga, X and Orb Medals into the Ultra Z Riser, Riku can access a new form of Geed, . The form is based on his default Fusion Rise, Primitve, focusing on a balanced fighting style but serve as an upgrade over the former. In the same way as Z, Geed can summon an enlarged Z Riser as a handheld weapon. The three Medals were given to Haruki when Geed's original Riser was fixed, in addition to his own , which turns into the  when Z assumes Delta Rise Claw.

In Ultraman Fusion Fight! Z Heat, Geed can assume a game-exclusive form, through Jack, Cosmos and Nexus Medals. This form allows him to erect defensive barriers and performing counter style fighting moves.

 reprises his role as Riku Asakura.

Sora
 is a Blue Tribe female Ultra that debuted in Ultraman Festival 2018, before making her video appearances in Ultra Galaxy Fight: The Absolute Conspiracy. She worked as a scientist under the tutelage of Ultraman Hikari and is a childhood friend of Ultraman Ribut. In Chapter 1 of The Absolute Conspiracy, Sora and Yullian were present on Planet Kanon when Leugocyte commenced its attack. As a result of her contribution to saving Max, she was awarded with a membership in the Galaxy Rescue Force alongside Ribut.

Sora wears the  armor around her torso, allowing her to conjure the  energy barrier.

 reprised her voice role as Sora since Ultraman Festival 2018. Megumi also voiced Ultraman Justice on a dual role in Ultra Galaxy Fight.

Ultraman Ribut
First appearing in Ultra Galaxy Fight: New Generation Heroes,  is a member of the Galaxy Rescue Force and the protagonist of The Absolute Conspiracy's first chapter. It focuses on Ribut's early days as a Civilization Guardian before his induction into the Galaxy Rescue Force. While investigating the dying Planet Mikarito, Ribut and Max were caught in Tartarus' plot to strengthen Maga-Orochi by having the latter infected. Ribut survived the fight to report the incident to the Inter-Galactic Defense Force and trained alongside Great and Powered to obtain his Ribut Blocker and Spreader Rod. Through the Gudis Vaccine given by Sora, he purified Max from his infection and together with Xenon, they destroy Maga-Orochi. For his bravery, both Ribut and Sora were recruited into the Galaxy Rescue Force.

In Chapter 3, Ribut and Andro Melos rushed to Planet Maijii to assist the Tri-Squad in their fight against Zett under Zero's wish, wanting the pair and the Tri-Squad to be conscripted into the Ultra League in against Tartarus' schemes. When Yullian was threatened in Planet Ebil, Zero led the Ultra League to her defense, but was unsuccessful in preventing her capture by Tartarus.

He was invited by Zero in episode 20 of Ultraman Z & Ultraman Zero Voice Drama to give Z a lecture about the Galaxy Rescue Force before he left on an emergency.

 reprises his voice role as Ultraman Ribut. In the English dub, he is voiced by Josh Keller.

Ultra League
The  is an all-star team formed under Taro's suggestion to foil Tartarus' schemes in The Absolute Conspiracy. Led by Ultraman Zero, its members include alliances from Galaxy Rescue Force and New Generation Heroes. When Yullian was threatened on Planet Ebil by Zett's Zetton Army, the team appeared to support Taiga, Mebius, Z and 80, but was unsuccessful in saving Yullian. As Zero departed during the events of Ultraman Z, remaining team members continue their war against The Kingdom.

The Ultra League is a concept envisioned by director Koichi Sakamoto to unify characters from different generations, as he is well aware that famous teams such as the Ultra Brothers and New Generation Heroes were only fixed by their respective eras.

: The strongest warrior in Planet U40. Before Tartarus could destroy his home planet, Joneus stepped in to defend and forced the alien to retreat. He was recruited by Zero not long after in their campaign against Tartarus.
Ultraman Ribut: See above
Andro Melos: See below
: The youngest sister to Rosso and Blu, transformed from Asahi Minato and named after Saki Mitsurugi's true name. While Rosso and Blu were off-planet to handle the Devil Splinter cases, Grigio was left behind on Ayaka City to fight against Noiseler and Zandrias. She was recruited by Zero in the light of Tartarus' abuse of temporal abilities.
: A group of three Ultra Warriors from Ultraman Taiga. After being rescued by the Galaxy Rescue Force, Taro conscripted the three into Zero's Ultra League.
: The son of Ultraman Taro and the team leader. At some point after training for the Ultra League's mission with Mebius, the pair and Z left for Planet Ebil to save Yullian and 80 from Zett's Zetton Army. In the English dub, he is voiced by Matthew Masaru Barron.
: A U40 Ultra Warrior with emphasis of brute strength. In the English dub, he is voiced by Jeff Manning.
: An Ultra from Planet O-50 using speed and stealth techniques. In the English dub, he is voiced by Chris Wells.

Other Ultra Warriors
In Ultraman Z, the Land of Light developed both the Ultra Z Risers and Ultra Medals to combat multiple universal threats, including widespread cases of Devil Splinter attacks. The theft of these items by Genegarg and its destruction on Earth scattered the Medals across the city, with selected few are already in possession of Haruki and other people. In addition to the sets that Z used into assuming his Ultra Fusions, another six Medals were salvaged by GAFJ for research purposes, but Haruki was able to reclaim them all during the conflict against the first Alien Barossa.

: A peacekeeping organization in the Land of Light, it was founded after Alien Empera's defeat and his army retreating from Nebula M78.
: Originally known as Ultraman Ken, he was a long time comrade of Belial who elevated into the rank of Supreme Commander of the Inter-Galactic Defense Force and courted Marie after defeating Alien Empera during the Great Ultra War. Both of the events however led to his friendship with Belial falling apart.
: Originally known as Ultrawoman Marie in her younger years, she met her future husband Ken during their war against Alien Empera. Unfortunately her marriage with Ken was one of the many factors that led to Belial's downfall after he failed to court the young woman.
: A division of 11 Ultras known for their contribution on a different planet Earth. During the events of The Absolute Conspiracy, the core six members of Ultra Brothers fought against the Parallel Isotopes of Juda, Mold, Belial and Tregear. Although managed to destroy the Gua Army commanders, they were defeated by the Absolutian-powered fallen Ultras before Zero interfered.
: The Commander of the Inter-Galactic Defense Force and the leader of Ultra Brothers. In addition to participating in the campaign against Tartarus' grand schemes, a young Zoffy was featured in Belial's past after the latter touched the Plasma Spark. Once reclaimed by Yoko, she delivered it to Z as new additions to his recovered Ultra Medals, allowing him to execute M78 Style Shining Tornado Slash when used alongside Jack and Father of Ultra's Medals.
: See here.
: See here.
: See here.
Prior to the series, Ace was Z's godfather, giving the young warrior his name back in the Land of Light. Ace appeared on Haruki's Earth after being guided by his namesake Medal where he fought against Baraba alongside Z. They combined their energies to form Space Z and brought an end to the Terrible-Monster.
: See here.
The real Ultraman Leo appears in episode 10 of Sevenger Fight, assisting STORAGE's Sevenger in against an army of monsters in Suflan Island.
: One of the many members of the Ultra Brothers, he was established in episode 19 of Ultraman Z & Ultraman Zero Voice Drama to have use his teaching experience at Sakuragaoka Middle School as a teacher in the Land of Light, one of his students being Taiga and Z. In The Absolute Conspiracy, 80 led a strike team consist of Neos and Seven 21 in a campaign against Leugocyte. After Yullian's escort ship was destroyed in Planet Ebil, 80, Mebius, Z and the Ultra League fought against Zett's Zetton Army, but failed to prevent Yullian's capture. In the English dub, he is voiced by Iain Gibb.
: See here.
: A scientist in the ranks of the Ultra Brothers. In The Absolute Conspiracy, Hikari assisted Sora in the creation of Gudis Vaccine to counter Max's infection. During Tartarus' time travel, events leading to Hikari's downfall became one of the many factors for Tregear to accept Tartarus' offer. Episode 6 of Ultraman Z & Ultraman Zero Voice Drama revealed that he created the Z Riser to fight against the Devil Splinter cases and named it after Ultraman Z when he volunteered to be a tester. In Ultraman Z, Hikari (through Pega) gave Riku a Z Riser and three Ultra Medals as alternatives while fixing the damaged Geed Riser.
: The royal princess in the Land of Light's monarchy system. She volunteered herself alongside Sora into a diplomatic meeting with Izana on Planet Kanon for a negotiation and was protected by 80 at the last minute from Leugocyte's attack. While being escorted to Planet Kanon for a diplomatic mission with the Galactic Federation, her ship was attacked by Zett and crashed on Planet Ebil, where she was targeted by Tartarus and the Zetton Army. Despite Mebius, Z and the Ultra League's intervention, Yullian was successfully kidnapped by Tartarus in a hostage situation for the Land of Light. She was imprisoned in Narak alongside an unidentified Ultra.
: An Ultra who had fought Gudis during his active period on Earth. He mentored Ribut in his training on Planet K76 and gave him his Spreader Rod as a congratulatory gift before accompanying him into Planet Mikarito to save Max.
: Alongside Great, he is Ribut's instructor and provided the young Ultra his Ribut Blocker once he completed his training. Kane also provided the grunts of Ultraman Powered in The Absolute Conspiracy in both languages.
: A member of the Elite Task Force and is part of 80's strike team in against Leugocyte.
: Neos' partner and a member of the Galactic Security Agency, joining 80 as part of his task force.
: A Civilization Guardian who mentored Ribut during his younger days. While investigating Planet Mikarito, he was infected by the Gudis Cells by Alien Sran to be turned into a monster while slowly being fed to Maga-Orochi. Ribut managed to rescue him and undo the mutation with Sora's Gudis Vaccine, eventually joined by Xenon to destroy the Maga-Orochi. In the English dub, he is voiced by Maxwell Powers.
: Max's partner and a fellow Civilization Guardian. He delivers the Max Galaxy to recharge his partner's energy and participated in the fight against an empowered Maga-Orochi.
: An elderly Ultra warrior residing in Planet King. Tartarus' actions in orchestrating various events (including his tampering with Maga-Orochi) was detected by King himself in his home planet.
: See here.
: A legendary Ultra Warrior resulted from the fusion of Cosmos and Justice. He was formed to counter Tartarus' brief assault on Planet Feed before the golden being escaped.
: The blue warrior of kindness, he and Justice joined the Inter-Galactic Force in their fight against Leugocyte and Tartarus. Cosmos revealed that he and Justice were investigating an energy source that was detected even from the dimension where he briefly fought alongside Zero and Dyna. It was originally under GAFJ's possession after being scattered on Earth, but a three-way battle between STORAGE, Alien Barossa and Celebro ensued over its owner until Z reclaim it to execute  alongside Nexus and Mebius. In the English dub, he is voiced by Peter von Gomm.
: A member of the Universal Justice, first appearing in Ultraman Cosmos 2: The Blue Planet. Under direct orders from Delacion, Justice was accompanied by Cosmos into investigating a massive energy source. Their work led them into joining the Inter-Galactic Defense Force in their campaign against Leugocyte and Tartarus. He is voiced by Megumi Han in Japanese and Rumiko Varnes in English.
: See here
: A team of Ultra Warriors starting from Ultraman Ginga to Ultraman Taiga. Their Medals were not part of the collections that Genegarg had stolen, thus Geed was able to use three of them to assume Galaxy Rising. After having his Geed Riser repaired, he gave the Medals to Haruki, in addition to his personal Medal. Aside from the aforementioned form, Geed (and later Z) could also utilize the Ginga, X and Orb Medals to execute the  attack. At the time of The Absolute Conspiracy, some of its members went scattered to handle the Devil Splinter cases across the outer space, with available ones were conscripted into the Ultra League alliance to fight the threats unleashed by The Kingdom.
Ultrawoman Grigio and Tri-Squad: See above

Supporting heroes
: A group of giant heroes assembled by Zero at the time of Belial's reign in Another Space. The members are viewpoint characters in their namesake online novel, chronicling their exploits in events after Ultra Zero Fight and prior to Ultraman Geed.
: A former member of the Pirates of Flames. In his guest appearance in episode 3 of Ultraman Z & Ultraman Zero Voice Drama, he was invited by Zero to give a brief talk over his team to Ultraman Z. During his spin-off novel, Glenfire encountered an ice creature whose role is to cultivate life on planets. He protected the creature from an enhanced Legionoid and parted ways after seeing the ice creature fulfill its deed. His voice role is reprised by Tomokazu Seki.
: The younger brother to Jean-bot. In his guest appearance in episode 9 of Ultraman Z & Ultraman Zero Voice Drama, Jean-nine visited the Land of Light under an errand to meet Zero, only to vent his anger on Z and his leader for the former's constant misnaming.
: A half Esmeraldian and a two-dimensional people. During his spin-off novel, Mirror Knight was sent to repair a crack from the infinity mirror after the events of Ultra Zero Fight, but his trauma from being poisoned by Belial and killed by Zero Darkness haunted him, until he overcame it with the help of a childhood friend. Together, the two unleashed a self-regeneration power onto the infinity mirror to heal itself despite the long process.
: A peacekeeping universal-scale organization that protects life forms from all threats. Team members are consist of elites from various parts of the universe, including Ribut and Sora from the Land of Light. During Tartarus' campaign against the Land of Light, a few operatives joined Zero's Ultra League to prevent Yullian's kidnapping with little success.
: The queen of Planet Kanon, preceding Amate as the War Deity. She negotiated with Yullian and Sora prior to Leugocyte's attack on the planet.
: An Andro People and a former leader of the Andro Defense Force, having resigned from his position when he started to become supplanted by younger members, including Andro Ares. When Zett launched his Zetton Army towards the Tri-Squad, Melos and Ribut joined the young Ultras in their fight and eventually participated in Zero's Ultra League to save Yullian from her kidnapping by Zett and Tartarus.
: First appeared in Ultraman Geed The Movie.

Antagonists

Celebro
 is an intelligent space parasite capable of possessing other creatures. On other planets, Celebro earn the reputation for stirring wars and bringing destruction to other civilizations all for the sake of his twisted , simply by goading any civilization into creating their strongest weapon before he turned it against their creators. In Ja no Michi wa Hebi novel, Celebro gave Phalaris a seed of the Tree of Life that resulted with Sagittari's mutation into Grigio Raiden, who Celebro would use to destroy the capital of Imbat Federation before sending it to Earth where events of Ultraman Z would took place.

After using Genegarg to steal a Z Riser and the Ultra Medals, Celebro possessed the GAFJ's Monster Research Center officer Shinya Kaburagi as means of operating on Earth and orchestrated monster attacks from behind the scenes for his twisted enjoyment. After Metsuboros' death, Celebro was forced to take GAFJ police captain Asano as his new host when Kaburagi's body was rendered too injured to be used. During GAFJ's hostile takeover of STORAGE, Celebro jumped into Kuriyama to use the director's authority to disband STORAGE and approving both the D4 experimentation and Ultroid Zero's creation. With Juggler finally showing up to claim the Ultroid Zero, Celebro has the STORAGE members targeted under false pretenses for being aliens and jump into Yoko for possession to claim control of the Ultroid Zero, finally merging it with several Monster Medals and other Earth monsters into Destrudos. After Yoko purged Celebro from her body, the alien was forced to parasitize Destrudos on its own and was defeated by the sheer bond between Haruki and Z. Juggler halted the alien parasite's attempt in escape, where Yuka and Kaburagi captured him to be dissected for all the trouble he had caused on Earth.

In addition to his own Ultra Z Riser and a personalized Ultra Access Card, Celebro crafted his own  through reverse engineering from the Land of Light's Ultra Medals and monster samples from the Monster Research Center.

Grigio Raiden/Sagittari
 is a monster who was originally a female alien sniper named , a former special-forces member of the Interstellar Alliance.

In the novel Ja no Michi wa Hebi, Sagittari was an orphan came from a war-torn planet wherein she was raised into a child soldier and eventually gets hired by the Interstellar Alliance. Despite performing various missions for the Alliance, she and her troops were left to die by the same team after an internal conflict, with the Alliance eventually erasing records of her existence to cover up their mistake. Seeking revenge on the Alliance, she climbed the Warrior's Peak on Planet O-50 to obtain the power to transform into the monster  and eventually collaborating with arms dealer Phalaris. With the seed of the Tree of Life obtained, Sagittari was trapped in the Grigio form when it was permanently transformed into Grigio Raiden, modified and brainwashed by Phalaris into a rampaging cyborg monster. Raiden was originally manipulated by Phalaris to fight against Biranki's Gango, but with her master's death, the monster went on a rampaging spree in the capital of Imbat Federation.

Celebro later sent Raiden to Haruki's Earth while Juggler followed in-suit, intending to put her to sleep and giving her a mercy kill if necessary. In January 2010 (a decade prior to Ultraman Z), Grigio Raiden crash landed on Mount Fuji in Yamanashi Prefecture under Celebro's intent of pushing GAFJ into developing the SAA Units. In the present day, Grigio Raiden awakened and began consuming cars to replenish its energy. Fighting against the SAA units and Ultraman Z, she was killed by Yoko in King Joe STORAGE Custom when Haruki became hesitant due to the trauma of killing Red King. Grigio Raiden's main ability is to utilize electricity-based attacks, such as the  breath attack and  fired from its back cannon.

Ultroid Zero/Destrudos
 was the strongest robot weapon developed by GAFJ after STORAGE's disbandment, hence its development leader was Mai Yuki instead of Inaba. According to Yuka, the robot was declared as an abomination by the will of the Earth, which resulted with five monsters teaming up against Ultroid during its first test run. After Yoko used it in against three subterranean monsters, Juggler and Celebro try to fight for the robot's possession to further each other's agenda. Celebro possessed Yoko and claim the robot for his own to absorb all Monster Medals and other monsters to transform into . In the fight against Ultraman Z, Destrudos defeated him with the D4 Ray and continues to attack major cities in the entire globe during Haruki's recuperation. After returning to Japan to confront STORAGE members, Destrudos fought against the three SAA Units before Haruki/King Joe STORAGE Custom punched his way through its cockpit to reclaim Yoko. Celebro was forced to take the cyborg monster as its final body in a last stand against Z and was destroyed by an enhanced Zestium Beam.

Ultroid Zero was built under the purpose of handling the D4 Ray, while incorporating combat data from the Ultra Warriors that STORAGE encountered and their King Joe STORAGE Custom, hence being declared as GAFJ's artificial Ultraman.

With the reclaimed Belial Medal, Celebro mutated Ultroid Zero into Destrudos by absorbing monsters under GAF's observations; Red King B, Dancan, Arstron, Birdon, Satan Beetle, Crescent and Majaba before he force injected the mecha with his entire possession of Monster Medals. The cyborg monster is piloted by a Celebro-possessed Yoko and is coated in a thick layer of metallic hide. After Yoko expel Celebro's control, the alien possessed Destrudos and granted the monster the ability to regenerate from injuries.

Absolute Tartarus
 is an  that debuted in Ultra Galaxy Fight: The Absolute Cospiracy. Tartarus had been observing the Ultra Warriors since the Great Ultra War and is capable of traversing between different eras. His true agenda is to provide a new home, for his race by taking the Land of Light and amasses his own personal army to do so.

His first plot was to evolve Maga-Orochi into Magatano-Orochi on Planet Mikarito by having Max infected with the Gudis Cells to accelerate the process. To fight against the Ultra Warriors, he also employ the help of Alien Sran, Hellberus, Leugocyte, Reibatos and Gymaira to his aid. While personally dealing against the Ultras, he was forced to back down when Cosmos and Justice fused into Legend and killed Sran for his incompetence. In addition to Alien Bat and Zett, Tartarus recruited more villains to his cause by tampering with the Land of Light's past to create Parallel Isotopes of the planet's past adversaries, recruiting Juda and Mold from the events of Andro Melos and Belial and Tregear before any of them would fall into the darkness. In the final chapter of The Absolute Conspiracy, Tartarus managed to kidnap Yullian and decided to use her as a bargaining chip for the Ultras to surrender the Land of Light to the Absolutians. He placed Yullian to be imprisoned alongside a mysterious figure.

Tartarus' main ability is to travel through time and tampering with the past by taking any villain he desired. Instead of a temporal paradox, this resulted in the creation of various alternate universes where each villains were extracted from their existence.

In the English dub, he is voiced by Walter Roberts, who stated to have give the alien the voice impression of Darth Vader.

Servants of The Kingdom
Exclusively to The Absolute Conspiracy, Tartarus amassed an army consisting of past adversaries from the Land of Light's history, having them swearing their allegiance to The Kingdom in his fight against the Ultra Warriors. He recruited them either through obtaining their  from alternate universes or using Reibatos' ability to revive monsters from the dead.

Aliens and fallen Ultras
He survived his defeat from Ultraman Great, but was killed by Tartarus for his incompetence.
: The major antagonist of Ultra Fight Orb, a Reionics with the ability to resurrect deceased monsters into his servitude. Tartarus saved Reibatos from his death by intercepting at the last minute where Belial executed him. The necromancer had since served him to revive past villains such as Alien Bat from Ultraman Saga and Gymaira.
: See here.
: See here.
: One of the commanders of Gua Army and is the youngest brother in his siblings. Although supposedly killed during the events of Ultra Fight Victory, Juda was conscripted into Tartarus' Parallel Isotopes by being dragged from the events of Andro Melos miniseries alongside Mold. The brothers fought against the 6 Ultra Brothers in  despite their intention to fight the Andro Defense Force in the present day. Both Juda and Mold were killed by Taro's Cosmo Miracle Beam when the latter combined with the rest of the Ultra Brothers. His voice role is reprised by Nobuaki Kanemitsu in Japanese.
: The eldest brother of the Gua Army's commander siblings, he was originally killed in episode 15 of Ultraman X by the combined forces of Ultraman Gingavictory and Exceed X. Tartarus recruited Mold and Juda by jumping into the past when he was still active during the events of Andro Melos, effectively making him a Parallel Isotope. The two brothers try to fight the original 6 Ultra Brothers on Satellite Golgotha in the present day, but were defeated by their combined Cosmo Miracle Beam, all while vowing that his sister Gina would avenge their deaths. He is voiced by Holly Kaneko in Japanese.
: Originally the main antagonist of Ultraman Saga, he was an alien who previously terrorized multiple planets for his own experimentations and was killed by Ultraman Saga in a fight that determined the fate of Planet Earth. He was revived by Reibatos to be conscripted into Tartarus' The Kingdom faction, where Bat complied by creating Zett.
: A modified Zetton given the ability of self-awareness, he was created by Alien Bat to eliminate the Ultra Warriors. Zett harassed the Tri-Squad members with the Zetton army during their training in Planet Maijii. According to Taiga and Titas, the two had encountered a different Zett on Planet U40 prior to meeting Fuma and forming the Tri-Squad. He was killed by the combined efforts of Taiga Tri-Strium and Z's Zestium Beam.

Monsters
: The main antagonist of Ultraman Orb. After infecting Max with the Gudis Cells, Alien Sran planned to provide the mutated Ultra as a food to Orochi for its evolution into Magatano-Orochi. Although Ribut managed to rescue Max, Orochi was hatched and empowered with the Gudis Cells as it was later on destroyed by Ribut, Max and Xenon.
: A monster that guarded the Maga-Orochi egg, fighting against Max and Ribut during their investigation in Planet Mikarito. It was killed by Ultraman Powered's Mega Spacium Beam. First appeared in episode 1 of Ultraman Taiga.
: The final villain of Ultraman R/B, Leugocyte was dragged into The Kingdom through Tartarus' tampering with the timeline to target Planet Kanon and the Ultras Sora and Yullian, before 80's timely arrival.
: A monster that was resurrected by Reibatos in order to fight 80 while he was preoccupied in against Leugocyte. It was killed by 80's Shooting Beam. First appeared in episode 17 of Ultraman 80.
: A monster summoned by Tartarus into the past, prior of Tregear's self exile. Night Fang was destroyed by Taro's Ultra Dynamite, but the latter was too late to reach out to his friend. First appeared in episode 7 of Ultraman Taiga.
: An army of Zettons that were artificially replicated by Alien Bat to serve as Zett's battalions. A smaller squadron were sent to fight the Tri-Squad on Planet Maijii and were destroyed after said team receiving assistance from the Galaxy Rescue Force. When 80 and Yullain were trapped in Planet Ebil, the Zetton Army try to keep them on bay until the arrival of the Ultra League destroyed them all. The team consists of:
: First appeared in episode 39 of Ultraman. In Ultraman Z,  were each used by two different persons; one in Juggler's possession to form Zeppandon, while the other was manufactured by Celebro to form Pedanium Zetton.
: First appeared in Ultraman Mebius Side Story: Ghost Reverse.
: A Zetton with a pair of arm scythes. The suit was made from modifying Zetton Alien Baltan of Ultraman Festival 2016 and Hyper Zetton Deathscythe from Ultraman Orb.
: First appeared in Ultraman Saga.

Other characters
Vice minister (3): The vice minister of the Global Allied Forces American Headquarters who came to Japan for the budget meeting. After Gomora's defeat, by the vice minister's authority, STORAGE got the funds for the second SAA.
: Haruki's father and a firefighter, he died in Giestron's attack when his son was a child. Through Bullton's temporal warping powers, an adult Haruki reunited with his late father from the past and received a handful of advice to finally put his guilt from killing monsters to rest.
: Haruki's mother who lives in his hometown, .
: A young girl from the year 1966, she was among the past victims of Kemurs' kidnapping and was forcefully used as a human cover to slip into the society in the year 2020. She was rescued by Z Delta Rise Claw and Beliarok, splitting her from the alien while preventing her tormentor's plans.
: Inaba's daughter and a biologist, she gained worldwide popularity by creating M1. After her creation was enlarged, Ruri collaborated with STORAGE to restore M1 to its original size and succeeded through her father.
: The director of GAF Australia branch during STORAGE's visit in Fight! Sevenger chapter 4.

Monsters and aliens

Ultraman Z
Devil Splinter victims
The  are fragments of Ultraman Belial that went scattered across the dimensions and sent the universe into a state of turmoil by manipulating monsters into berserk.
: First appeared in episode 9 of Ultraman Taiga.
: First appeared in episode 18 of Return of Ultraman.
: First appeared in episode 5 of Ultraman Taiga.
: A rogue AI and the main antagonist of Ultraman Geed The Movie. Originally destroyed by Geed Ultimate Final's Crescent Final Geed, the Devil Splinter resurrected it and fought Geed in Planet Ain, resulting in the destruction of his Geed Riser. After being destroyed by Ultraman Geed Galaxy Rising, the Core survived long enough to absorb silicons to repair itself, but STORAGE managed to lure it with a hoax information. The Devil Splinter used to resurrect him was salvaged by Celebro as part of the ingredients to create the Belial Medal.
: Gillvalis' combat form. Due to the resurrection via Devil Splinter, it managed to overwhelm the Giga Finalizer and made its way to Earth being chased by Geed Galaxy Rising. Upon being cornered by STORAGE, this forced Gillvalis to transform into a battered Perfect Form, where Z and Geed deal the finishing blow while Windom/Yoko uploaded the Millennium Prize Problems mathematical questions that distract the Core from self-resurrection.

Celebro-related
: A space monster that eats anything, Celebro possessed the monster as a medium to steal an Ultra Z Riser and a few Ultra Medals from the Land of Light while finding itself being chased from Z and Zero. After banishing Zero into Bullton's dimension, Genegarg made its way to Earth where it attacked the suburban area and the evacuation center (an elementary school). Upon fusing with Haruki, Z Alpha Edge destroyed Genegarg with Zestium Beam, causing the Ultra Medals to be scattered. However, Celebro managed to emerge unscathed and possessed Kaburagi instead. By itself, Genegarg is capable of firing  energy bullets and  energy beam from its mouth. Like real-life sharks, Genegarg can regurgitate the contents of its stomach through . It was designed by Kengo Kusunoki under the concept of "Jaws from space", while its name comes from the Greek word Geneion.
: A meteorite monster that Genegarg (Celebro) used to expel Zero into an alternate dimension. On Earth, the Celebro-possessed Kaburagi managed to obtain its parts and summons Bullton to trap the entire STORAGE workers into the fourth dimension. It was killed by Ultraman Z after throwing the monster mid-air, but the resulting destruction undo the seal which held Greeza in the first place. First appeared in episode 17 of Ultraman.
: As a result of the construction noise of an underground city in progress, Telesdon was awakened to attack said location. Despite Haruki's attempt in luring the monster away, Telesdon managed to destroy the site with its 2,000 degree flames. It resurfaced at some point later on in Kitabashi, Tokyo, where it faced against Z Beta Smash and Windom. Its beak is capable of using  to dig its way in underground area. First appeared in episode 22 of Ultraman.
: To test the ability of a Monster Medal, Celebro fed the Jirahs Medal to Telesdon, which resulted in gaining a frill similar to said monster. After Windom removed its frill, Z Alpha Edge fired Zestium Beam to destroy it. The Jirahs Medal was initially salvaged and dissipated in Haruki's possession. Using Jirahs' frills, Telesdon is capable of performing  beam,  as protection and  energy bullets.
: Gillvalis' squadron of robots from Ultraman Geed The Movie. Using leftover parts from the AI's Perfect Form, Celebro rebuild them as his personal soldiers and readily summoned through a handheld gun. Several of the troops were used to kidnap Riku for Celebro to extract his DNA and create Belial Medal, the last of these androids were destroyed by Juggler during his infiltration in Monster Research Center to intercept Celebro. At some point of time, the gun used to summon the android was harvested into , allowing Celebro to mutate Horoboros into Metsuboros alongside the Gillvalis Medal.
: Fusions of two different monsters with Belial's power from Ultraman Geed. With the Ultraman Belial Medal harvested through Riku's Belial DNA, Celebro transforms into all three of them with his Z Riser in the same way as Kei Fukuide from his active period to fight Z, Geed and Zero.
: Transformed through Gomora and Red King Medals. First appeared in episode 1 of Ultraman Geed.
: Transformed through Eleking and Ace Killer Medals. First appeared in episode 4 of Ultraman Geed.
: Transformed through King Joe and Zetton Medals. First appeared in episode 11 of Ultraman Geed.
: A combination of Golza, Melba and Super C.O.V. using their medals. Celebro first transforms to test the fusion's capability against Sevenger and Windom. When Jugger obtained the Fike King medal sets, he assumed Tri-King first to assist Z and Geed in fighting against Greeza.
: The upgraded form of Tri-King once scanning Reicubas and Gan-Q Medals, first appeared in episode 7 of Ultraman Ginga S. After overpowering Ultraman Z Beta Smash, Juggler turn the tables by providing the Ultra with Medals that provide access to Gamma Future. Using his new form, Z freezes Five King before he dive into the monster and destroy it from within. Celebro would lose the Medals after being ambushed by Juggler in the Monster Research Center, the latter would use Five King in a futile attempt to fight Greeza. After Juggler's defeat by Gamma Future, Celebro reclaimed Five King's Medals to transform into the colossal monster and fight Juggler and Z over the Ultroid Zero's ownership. After the battle, all five Medals were among those assimilated with Ultroid Zero into Destrudos.
: A pair of Alien Pitt sisters tasked by Celebro to gather the essences of Golza, Melba and Super C.O.V. before brainwashing them to gather the meteorite essence of Reicubas and Gan-Q. The sisters also kidnapped Yoko and Yuka after mistaking the two as Z's human host. The race first appeared in episode 3 of Ultraseven.
: An ancient monster in Shishigaoka that surfaced once in every 333 years when the sun faces a sunspot phenomenon. At four years old, the young Yuka gained her inspiration in researching monsters after she got lost at night and wandering in Horoboros' forbidden area. In the present day, Horoboros resurfaced and Yuka managed to use a conch shell's music to soothe the monster. Despite its intention to return to rest, Celebro transformed it into Metsuboros. From its own body, Horoboros can unleash volts of electricity, called  to every direction. First appeared in episode 10 of Ultraman R/B.
: In order to regain his Belial Medal, Celebro transformed Horoboros into a cyborg by injecting it with Galactron MK2 and Gillvalis' Medals. Under Yuka's wish, Z gave Horoboros a mercy kill via Deathcium Slash as it passes on to afterlife. The mechanical left claw that was left behind was salvaged by Barossa II as part of his collection of weapons.

Others
: First appeared in episode 1 of Ultra Q.
1: An 18 meter tall monster appearing in Chōfu, Tokyo. Despite Yoko's precautions to evade collateral damages, Gomess chased Haruki after his attempt to rescue a stray dog. This led to her frantically throwing Gomess to Chofu City Cultural Hall Tazukuri and eventually for her/Sevenger to destroy the entire hall.
23: A 50-meter variant of Gomess was one of the five monsters that awakened to destroy Ultroid Zero due to herboring the D4 Ray. It emerged from Mount Kuzuha alongside Demaaga and Pagos to fight said robot and was joined by Takkong and King Guesra when Ultraman Z joined the fray. It was among the three monsters to be killed by the D4 Ray.
: One of the many monsters to be awakened on Earth as a result of Genegarg's destruction. It has the ability to turn invisible and even disguising its body heat to match with the surroundings. Neronga was able to defeat Haruki in Sevenger by siphoning its battery reserves. While targeting a recently opened energy plant, Yuka tagged the monster with a marker and Z interfered to save Yoko in Sevenger. Using Hebikura's training on Haruki, the Ultra turn the tables and defeated the monster with Zestium Beam. Yuka managed to salvage a piece of its horn and used it to accelerate Windom's charging process. First appeared in episode 3 of Ultraman.
First appeared in episode 25 of Ultraman. Guigass' fight against Sevenger would later be the inspiration of Sevenger Fight miniseries.
STORAGE was ordered to relocate it to an uninhabited island while being observed by representatives from Global Allied Forces American Headquarters. While in mid-delivery, Gomora awakened due to hay fever and instantly provoked into almost attacking the GAF's meeting area. With Sevenger passed its time limit, Haruki transformed into Z, assuming Beta Smash for the first time and blowing Gomora to pieces with Zestium Upper. Its essence would later be turned into  in Celebro's possession. First appeared in episode 26 of Ultraman.
: An ancient monster sealed in Alaska by the Z Lance Arrow. When the weapon was removed, this unintentionally freed Peguila to attack the same research lab that studied the artifact. Yoko was frozen in Windom and this forced Haruki to board Sevenger unauthorized to save her when his Z Riser was briefly stolen by Juggler. Ultraman Z would obtain the weapon and defeated Peguila with Z Lance Fire. First appeared in episode 5 of Ultra Q.
: Riku Asakura's alien friend from Nebula House, accompanying him in the search of Belial's Devil Splinter across the universe. Under Hikari's orders, Pega delivered the Z Riser to replace Riku's damaged Geed Riser. Pega and the Nebula House tracked Riku to Haruki's Earth and the two friends reunite to hunt the Devil Splinters in space. His voice role is reprised by Megumi Han.
: A race of pirates born in a clutches of 10,000. They made their reputation by stealing weapons from their defeated opponents. Prior to the series, Ultraman Zero encountered a Barossa that fought using trickery. The Barossas are designed by Kengo Kusunoki as an alien that will represent the Reiwa era of Japan.
9, 10: The eldest brother of a Barossa clutch aimed for the Ultra Medals on Earth as his space treasure. Since he lacks a vocal cord to properly speak, he required a hypnotized victim as an interpreter. Using a hijacked King Joe, he managed to stole three of them from Monster Research Center and forced STORAGE to surrender the other three Medals in their possession. After surviving King Joe's defeat, Barossa breached into STORAGE headquarters to reclaim the robot but found itself fighting against STORAGE members. Through Dada's Micronizer Gun, he enlarged himself and fights Z with an array of stolen weapons. Although defeated by the Ultra's new attack, the slain Barossa claimed that his other 9,999 siblings shall avenge him.
: A second Barossa descended to Earth after Metsuboros' destruction, aiming for Ultraman Z's Beliarok and avenging his older brother. His quest led to a three way conflict when Juggler joins in for the sentient sword. After enlarging himself again through Juran seeds, Barossa II attempted to use Yoko/Windom as a hostage, but the Beliarok choose Z as his wielder again and finished the second Barossa with Deathcium Fang. He is voiced by Tomokazu Seki.
: The third Barossa is the older brother to the previous Barossa II, intending to avenge his other two brothers by personally dealing with Haruki three days after STORAGE's disbandment. He wielded Gorothunder's Goron Bō club weapon and enlarges by drinking bubble tea. While dealing against Z (who at that time was occupied by Five King/Juggler), he was killed when Sevenger/Yoko rode on top of the Leg Carrier and sliced by the Beliarok.
: The Alien Barossa's mecha robot and transportation, it was originally belonged to a defeated  before the space pirate used it in his quest to steal the Ultra Medals on Earth. The pursuit of the other trio Medals consist of Cosmos, Nexus and Mebius created a three-way conflict between STORAGE, Barossa and Celebro. Z managed to obtain them and initiated Lightning Generade to strike the separated mecha's weak points (its connection joints). The robot was afterward salvaged by STORAGE members while Barossa made it out safely. While attempting to breach into the STORAGE headquarters, Barossa attempted to reactivate the robot, but was thwarted by STORAGE members. The technology from King Joe was reverse engineered into King Joe STORAGE Custom as STORAGE's third SAA unit. First appeared in episode 14 of Ultraseven.
: A pair of parent monsters trying to defend their egg. The male Red King was killed by Z, but the female was spared from its death after discovering the egg it protected. The female Red King and its egg disappeared into the Fukama City's mountainous area, where Ultroid Zero approached it as the final monster to be absorbed to form Destrudos. Her unhatched egg was protected by Ultraman Z and relocated away from his fight with Destrudos. First appeared in episode 8 of Ultraman.
: A monster that appeared at a campsite in the past. Young Haruki and his parents got caught up in Giestron's attack, which killed his father. First appeared in episode 22 of Ultraman Taiga.
: A human-sized monster who strive on coins in order to survive. Finding itself within STORAGE base, Kanegon ate Haruki's Ultra Medals out of pure hunger, forcing the officer in patrol spending the rest of his duty trying to force them out. After all of the Medals were regurgitated, Kanegon left the base.
: A monster who served as the final villain of Ultraman X, originally a living anomaly sealed by Bullton during the creation of the universe. Greeza came to being as a result of Bullton's destruction, and proceed to absorb various objects as it slowly consuming the Earth. Geed allowed himself to be absorbed in order to find the space needle needed to destroy Greeza, but doing so gets him assimilated and briefly halting the monster's movements. By obtaining the Beliarok, Z Delta Rise Claw uses Deathcium Slash to destroy it. While assimilating Geed, Greeza briefly gains the ability to fire the Ultra's Wrecking Burst.
: First appeared in episode 18 of Ultra Q.
Its kidnapping was to ensure the success of Kemur's plans. After Kemur's death, Pagos was among the returned victims and was last seen burrowing itself back into underground.
23: Another Pagos surfaced in Mount Kuzuha to join Demaaga and Gomess in fighting against Ultroid Zero due to the presence of the D4 energy substance. It was killed by the D4 Ray alongside its two other subterranean monsters.
: A race of aliens who kidnap humans in order solve their aging problems. They originally carry out this operation back in 1966, wherein an operative was thwarted by the efforts of civilians working together with the police forces. Another operative was fused to Kaori, one of the abducted humans from 1966 and he uses her to mask their mass-kidnapping on Earth. However, because of Kaori's dedication to Earth, she constantly wrestles with the Kemur over the control of their bodies. Kemur's endgame was to disperse his  with a bomb and teleports the entire citizens of Kirimoto City. Using Beliarok, Z severed Kaori from Kemur, killing the alien and safely disposing the bomb in a pocket dimension.
Great Space Monster Bemstar (19): A space monster that devoured several of Global Allied Forces' spy satellites. Bemstar returned two years later to devour gas tanks as food sources, but in the middle of fighting the SAA Units, it fled after witnessing Yapool's dimension crack.
: One of the many Terrible-Monsters sent by Yapool to invade Earth during Ultraman Ace's active era. As Yapool had long dead, their spiritual grudge against Ultraman Ace gave birth to a sentient version of Baraba. It targeted Windom because of its resemblance to Ace and fought against Z using its variety of attacks. Ace appeared to join Z in the battle and the two combine their techniques into Space Z to destroy the Terrible-Monster. What remained of Baraba was the head blade that contain essences of Yapool's extra-dimensional energy, allowing GAFJ to weaponize said energy into the D4 Ray. In addition to its old set of attacks, Baraba is capable of utilizing Verokron's missiles and Jumboking's eye beams. Baraba is voiced by Holly Kaneko and first appeared in episode 13 of Ultraman Ace.
: An artificial life form created by Ruri Inaba, whose body cells became beneficial in the medical field. While being kidnapped by a terrorist organization, M1 grew into monstrous size after being knocked into a generator box. Despite GAFJ's orders to have it killed, STORAGE collaborated with Ruri to distract M1 away from a populated area. While M1 was restrained by the Beliarok's Deathcium Claw, Inaba shot the shrink serum through King Joe STORAGE Custom and returned M1 to its true size. First appeared in episode 10 of Ultra Q.
: A species of space monsters that attack planets in order to drain them of its strong energy supply. Due to GAFJ's experimentation with Yapool's extra-dimensional energy to create the D4 superweapon in Ganges Island, Kelbim appeared on Earth and set its sight on King Joe STORAGE Custom, the current holder of said weapon. The Mother Kelbim kept sending its eggs and hatched, cornering Yoko/King Joe STORAGE Custom when Z was off-planet to fight their parent. Out of weaponries left, Yoko used the D4 Ray to destroy the remaining Kelbims. First appeared in episode 4 of Ultraman Mebius.
: The parent of the Kelbims on Earth, standing at the height of 303 meters. Due to the presence of D4 Ray on Earth, she sent her children through asteroid eggs to secure Windom and continuously hatching more of her children while taking refuge in a space debris. Using Delta Rise Claw, Z killed her with the Beliarok's Deathcium Slash.
: An aquatic monster who surfaced from the Tsuruga Bay alongside King Guesra in  response to the D4 energy substance in Ultroid Zero. The two monsters fought Ultraman Z and reached Mount Kuzuha to join Demaaga, Pagos and Gomess in the fray. Takkong was defeated by the Beliarok's Deathcium Fang and returned to the sea alongside King Guesra. First appeared in episode 1 of Return of Ultraman.
: An aquatic monster that accompanied Takking in its quest from Tsuruga Bay to Mount Kuzuha to fight Ultroid Zero. King Guesra was defeated by the Beliarok's Deathcium Claw, but survived the entire fight and left alongside Takkong before the D4 Ray decimated the rest of the monsters. Prior to its appearance, a Guesra was one of the many monsters to be awakened by Genegarg's presence on Earth. First appeared in Superior Ultraman 8 Brothers.
: One of the many monsters to appear in Mount Kuzuha to destroy Ultroid Zero due to its presence of D4 energy substance. Alongside its subterranean brethren, it was decimated by the D4 Ray. First appeared in episode 1 of Ultraman X.

Ultra Galaxy Fight: The Absolute Conspiracy
: One of the many combatants of the Great Ultra War, fighting alongside Godola, Babarue and Nackle in against Ken and Belial. He was killed by Belial in the Director's Cut version. First appearing in episode 28 of Ultraman.
: One of Empera's soldiers, he was killed by Ultraman Belial. First appeared in episode 4 of Ultraseven.
: One of Empera's soldiers, he was ordered alongside Babarue to act as diversions for Ken and Belial while the dark ruler lay waste on the Land of Light. Despite Nackle's plea for mercy reached Ken, Belial slaughtered him out of spite.
: One of Empera's soldiers, acting as diversions for Ken and Belial alongside Nackle. He was killed by Belial when Nackle's plea for mercy went ignored. First appeared in episode 38 of Ultraman Leo.
During his invasion on the Land of Light, Empera slew a group of Ultras and managed to defeat Ken and Belial. When Marie presented Ken with the Ultimate Blade, the two warriors went into a swordsfight and delivered matching scars on each other's right waist. The Empera disappeared after that, but his presence lay impact on Belial and became one of the factors of his eventual downfall. In the Japanese dub, he is voiced by Tomokazu Seki, who also voiced Ultraman Great in a dual role for The Absolute Conspiracy.
: A young monster partnering with Noiseler to fight Grigio on Ayaka City. The pair left the Earth after Grigio scared them with Grigio Shoot. First appeared in episode 4 of Ultraman 80.
: A bat-themed space monster that partnered with Zandrias in terrorizing the outskirts of Ayaka City. First appeared in episode 7 of Ultraman 80.

Fight! Sevenger
: An alien robot that fought Sevenger in the day before Ultraman Z's arrival. Sent by Alien Banda, Crazygon was intercepted in its theft of cars by Haruki/Sevenger, who uses Inaba's boxing skills to save the drivers and destroy the robot's door. He would later destroy Crazygon with Sevenger's headbutt attack. First appeared in episode 38 of Ultraseven.
: A sea monster that attacked various delivery ships. A customized Sevenger shoot Deeplus with a harpoon and made use of its faulty jetpack to drag the monster to the surface, simultaneously killing it. First appeared in episode 23 of Ultraman Dyna.
: A monster that originated from the Kamakura period. It was originally sealed in  after a sumo fight, next to a local shrine and had since revered by the nearby villagers. Jirangon was unsealed from Mount Jirao due to prolonged heavy rain in Gunma Prefecture, wherein Sevenger intercepted the monster before it could progress to the urban areas. Using Jirangon's own legend in the past, Haruki/Sevenger challenged the monster into a sumo match and was sealed again in Mount Jirao.
: A grasshopper-like monster that appeared during STORAGE's visit to GAF Australia branch, with Yoko already dispatched in Sevenger and uses a giant hand fan to kill Majaba in a single hit. In Ultraman Z, another Majaba in Australia was absorbed by Ultroid Zero as part of the components required to form Destrudos. First appeared in episode 8 of Ultraman: Towards the Future.
: Originally a sentient cloud of red gas coming from outer space, it transformed into a monster after being affected by the rain in an urban area. Red Smogy was reverted to its cloud form when Haruki used the robot's jetpack in a similar manner to a dryer, while Yuka was sent by Hebikura to gather the red gas specimen for a research collaboration with the Monster Research Center. During Vortex Fire's reign of terror, STORAGE brought in a restrained Red Smogy to be used as a distraction, tossing it towards the former monster before Haruki/Sevenger delivers his final blow. First appeared in episode 4 of The Ultraman.
: A shark/whale monster that attacked several ships at some point after Garamon's invasion. Inaba took it to himself to sortie with Sevenger, using its Drill Fist to counter the monster's nose blade weapon. First appeared in episode 53 of Ultraman Taro.
: A monster that STORAGE pursued to prevent him from destroying a nearby dam in his running track. Under Inaba's advice, Haruki/Sevenger performed a suplex and slams the monster's head to the ground, transforming him into the form of a teenager. In the midst of STORAGE's campaign against Vortex Fire, Yoko/SAA 2 Prototype Machine took advantage of Idatenran into a relay race to deliver Red Smogy to Haruki/Sevenger. First appeared in episode 48 of Ultraman 80.
: A monster which was designed under the winner of Televi-Kun's designing contest. Due to its enormous power STORAGE deployed a restrained Red Smogy for Yoko SAA 2 Prototype Machine and Idatenran to deliver as Haruki/Sevenger toss the monster into a distraction, allowing him to deliver a headbutt attack to end Vortex Fire's reign of terror.
Both monsters were defeated by STORAGE after luring them away from the mountains. First appeared in episode 2 of Ultraman Tiga.
: The single horned monster and the first to be awakened. Yoko and Yuka proceed to lure it away from the construction site until it was joined by Gakuma (Beta), where Haruki/Sevenger took advantage of the situation by tricking both monsters to ram against the other, leaving Gakuma (Alpha) as the first to be incapacitated.
: The second Gakuma to be awakened, joining Alpha in their chase against Yoko and Yuka. After accidentally incapacitated against its partner, Beta was killed after Haruki/Sevenger used the jetpack's boosters for a boosted headbutt attack.
After initially incapacitating Yoko with a mouth gag, Ashuran was later forced to fight another Sevenger that was sent by Ultraseven as Yoko/SAA 1 Sevenger join the fight shortly after. Through Yuka's advice, the Sevengers proceed to attack Ashuran on both sides of its faces that resulted with the monster's own destruction. First appeared in episode 34 of Ultraman Leo.
: A robot monster that was once used by Ultraseven from episode 34 of Ultraman Leo. When Yoko/SAA 1 Sevenger was incapacitated, Seven gave Haruki the Monster Ball to summon his Sevenger. With Juggler freeing Yoko from captivity, both Sevengers join the fight and proceed to defeat Ashuran after punching the monster on both sides. After the battle ended, Seven's Sevenger disappeared from the scene.

Sevenger Fight
: A monster that Sevenger fought at some point prior to Ultraman Z. In the series proper, Celebro harvest its remains into  to empower Telesdon into Erimaki Telesdon. First appeared in episode 10 of Ultraman.
: A space robot which the GAF America defeated and detained into the  prior to the events of Ultraman Z. Although modified into its current form to serve GAF America, Alt-Hellzking escaped and went out of control, forcing Sevenger to fight against it. First appeared in episode 61 of Ultraman Cosmos.
: A space monster belonging to Alien Pitts "Fa" and "Si" that was accidentally left behind at some point after being freed from Celebro's mind control. Eleking fought against Sevenger and was killed after accidentally firing the robot's rifle to itself. During Space Sevenger's crash landing to an alien planet, another Eleking was one of the natives of that planet. It fought against Gazort II after the latter accidentally stepping onto its tail and was killed by Space Sevenger when it accidentally joined the fray. First appeared in episode 3 of Ultraseven.
: A space monster that was originally under containment, until it escaped with a missile in its mouth. Haruki in Sevenger was dispatched to reclaim the stolen missile and finally calming it down before its battery supply ended. In Ultraman Z, Dancan was detained in China and was among the monsters to be absorbed by Ultroid Zero to transform into Destrudos. First appeared in episode 34 of Ultraseven.
: A pair of meteorite monsters sent as invasion weapons, they became Sevenger's final opponent before its retirement. After killing a Pigmon, the Garamons were destroyed in explosion when Haruki exerted most of Sevenger's energy reserves against the monsters. Another Garamon was one of the many residents of an alien planet which Space Sevenger crash landed during its warp drive. Garamon accompanied Gundar and Icarus during their fight against the space robot. First appeared in episode 13 of Ultra Q.
: A small monster encountered by Sevenger during its fight against a pair of Garamons. Pigmon was killed after being stomped by one of the Garamons. First appeared in episode 8 of Ultraman.
Monster Planet residents (6, 7): During Space Sevenger's interstellar exploration, the robot crash-landed on a planet inhabited by monsters, forcing it to fend itself against the incoming monsters. Through Ultraman Z Beta Smash's arrival, the monsters were killed one by one.
: After accidentally stepping on Eleking's tail, Gazort was forced to fight the monster and eventually Space Sevenger as well into a three-way battle. It was killed after the robot uses a rod as a weapon. First appeared in episode 15 of Ultraman Tiga.
: A Pandon that was modified by its master into a cyborg monster weapon. It ambushed Space Sevenger after killing Gazort II and Eleking, and eventually joined by Icarus' gang of monsters. First appeared in episode 49 of Ultraseven.
: One of the many residents of an alien planet, bringing along a Gundar and Garamon into the fight against Space Sevenger. First appeared in episode 10 of Ultraseven.
: One of Alien Icarus' monsters in fighting against Space Sevenger. In episode 9, another Gundar attacked the GAF base in Suflan Island to steal the freezing liquid for its own consumption, fighting against both Haruki/Sevenger and Pestar. It was killed after clashing its attack with Pestar. First appeared in episode 25 of Ultraseven.
: The true mastermind behind the monster army attack against Space Sevenger. Juggler killed the alien after the latter's monster army was eliminated by Space Sevenger and Z. First appeared in episode 48 of Ultraseven.
: A space robot armed with multitudes of cannons and firearms. Originally a defense turret set up at the GAF base in Suflan Island, cosmic energy radiated the turret and transformed it into Beam Missile King to threaten the freezing operation. It was defeated by Haruki/Sevenger. First appeared in the manga adaptation of Ultraman Mebius Side Story: Ghost Reverse.
: A starfish-like monster that is native to Suflan Island's lake, attacking the GAFJ base after mistaking their freezing liquid tank for petroleum. It was killed after being tricked by Haruki/Sevenger into clashing its flames with Gundar's freezing breath. First appeared in episode 13 of Ultraman.
: The leader of an army of monsters who transformed the GAF base's turret into Beam Missile King. Ultraman Leo killed the alien and the latter's minions. First appeared in episode 33 of Ultraman Leo.
: One of Alien Akumania's minions. First appeared in episode 27 of Ultraman Leo.
: One of Alien Akumania's minions. First appeared in episode 11 of Ultraman Leo.
: One of Alien Akumania's minions. First appeared in episode 19 of Ultraman Leo.
: One of Alien Akumania's minions. In Ultraman Z, another Satanbeetle from Siberia was among the monsters absorbed by Ultroid Zero to transform into Destrudos. First appeared in episode 25 of Ultraman Leo.

Novel-exclusives
Life's Decision Height: The Story of STORAGE's Foundation
: A monster that appeared five years prior to Ultraman Z. Originally a space gem extracted from Mars, Namegon came to existence when the gem accidentally fell into the ocean, resulting in the 30 meter monster's release. Even with the assistance of US army, Namegon rampaged in Japan for two weeks unopposed before Sevenger (piloted by Juggler) was created and sent to deal with it as the robot's first victory. First appeared in episode 3 of Ultra Q.

Ja no Michi wa Hebi
: An alien girl from Ultraman Orb Chronicle novel, who persistently chasing after Juggler despite her love being one-sided. She willingly allowed herself to be captured by Phalaris and forced to wear a headband that restricted her control over monsters for the sake of meeting Juggler. As a result of manipulating Gango into fighting Grigio Raiden and was caught in the latter monster's blast, Biranki was rendered amnesiac, where Juggler puts her under the care of Jinobe and entrusted her with his pet snake before he departed with Raiden to Haruki's Earth in 2010. In Jugglus Juggler Chronicle Photo Book, she is portrayed by Hikari Kuroki, who also portrays Yuka Ohta in Ultraman Z.
: A monster that Biranki used to manipulate from Ultraman Orb Chronicle novel, as well as its brethren originally appearing in episode 11 of Ultraman. Biranki summoned it to fight against the Grigio Raiden that was manipulated by Phalaris.
: A member of the Interstellar Alliance and the consul of Planet Kanon. Centuries after the events of Ultraman Orb: The Origin Saga, Planet Kanon has joined the Interstellar Alliance and the monarchy has been abolished.
After being given a seed of the Tree of Life, Phalaris turned into a power hungry person who brainwashed and modified Sagittari/Grigio into Grigio Raiden. He was killed in the ensuing conflict between Raiden and Biranki's Gango, causing the former monster to went rogue and used by Celebro to destroy the Imbat Federation.
: An alien hitman who contracted with darkness, which allows him to utilize randomly selected Monster Cards and harness their powers. He participated in a life-or-death battle over the seed of Tree of Life hosted by Phalaris. During his fight with Juggler, he unfortunately got Greeza's Monster Card and was dragged into the void by the card's power.
: An alien mad scientist from episode 15 of Ultraman Taiga, the novel itself chronicling his exploits prior to his onscreen debut. He participated in the hunt for the seed of Tree of Life and fought against Juggler through Zigzag.
: Mabuze's artificial giant that he created by stitching the corpses of Alien Baltan, Alien Zamu and Alien Tsuruk.
Anti-Gravity Alien Alien Godola: An alien who runs a tavern.
: An alien who worked as a dancer in Godola's tavern. First appeared in episode 46 of Ultraseven.
He helped fixing Juggler's Jashin Blade and was entrusted to take care of the amnesiac Biranki before the latter's departure with Grigio Raiden.
: A weapons merchant with knowledge of Sagittari's past. First appeared in episode 3 of Ultraseven X.
: A female space Mafia member with knowledge of Celebro and his Civilization Self-Destruction Game. The race first appeared in episode 27 of Ultraseven.

Notes

References

External links
Official website for the cast list of Ultraman Z

, Ultraman Z
Z